Central California is the central portion of the U.S. state of California. Central California may also refer to:

 United States District Court for the Central District of California
 Willams, California, formerly Central, California
 Central California Conference, an athletic organization

See also
 California (disambiguation)